Politics of Montserrat takes place in a framework of a parliamentary representative democratic dependency, whereby the Premier is the head of government, and of a  multi-party system. Montserrat is an internally self-governing overseas territory of the United Kingdom. The United Nations Committee on Decolonization includes Montserrat on the United Nations list of non-self-governing territories. Executive power is exercised by the government. Legislative power is vested in both the government and the Legislative Assembly.
The Judiciary is independent of the executive and the legislature. Military defence is the responsibility of the United Kingdom.

Executive branch

|King
|Charles III
|
|8 September 2022
|-
|Governor
|Sarah Tucker
|
|6 April 2022
|-
|Premier
|Easton Taylor-Farrell
|MCAP
|19 November 2019
|}
The Governor is appointed by the Monarch. The Premier is appointed by the Governor from among the members of the Legislative Assembly.

His cabinet is appointed by the Governor from among the elected members of the Legislative Assembly and consists also of the Attorney General, and the Finance Secretary.

The current Premier of the island is Easton Taylor-Farrell, of the Movement for Change and Prosperity, replacing the outgoing Premier, Donaldson Romeo of the People's Democratic Movement, who was the second Premier of Montserrat.

Legislative branch
Montserrat elects on territorial level a legislature. The Legislative Assembly has 9 members, elected for a five-year term in one constituency.

Political parties and elections
Political parties do not adhere to a single defined ideology and are difficult to distinguish from each other. Instead, policy emphasis shifts depending on the popular approval of the party leader and their policies.

Most recent election

Judicial branch
The Eastern Caribbean Supreme Court, consists of the High Court of Justice and the Court of Appeal.

Administrative divisions
Montserrat is divided in 3 parishes; Saint Anthony, Saint Georges, and Saint Peter.

International organization participation
CARICOM, Caribbean Development Bank, ECLAC (associate), ICFTU, Interpol (subbureau), Organization of Eastern Caribbean States, WCL

References